Valentina Strobl (born 12. May 2000 in Innsbruck ) is an Austrian Paralympic equestrian. She qualified for the 2020 Summer Paralympics.

Career 
She competed at the 2018 CDI Juniors Tour.
She competed at the Commercial Bank Chi Al Shaqab, Para Dressage CPEDI3 .

References

External links 

 
 https://www.eurodressage.com/node/85669
 https://eurodressage.com/node/53551

Equestrians at the 2020 Summer Paralympics
Paralympic equestrians of Austria
Living people
2000 births